In Greek mythology, Epopeus (derived from  ("to look out", "observe"), from  ("over") and  ("eye")) was the name of the following figures:
Epopeus, king of Sicyon.
Epopeus, king of Lesbos and both father and rapist of Nyctimene.
 Epopeus, one of the sailors who tried to delude Dionysus, but were turned into dolphins.
 Epopeus, a man from Lemnos, killed by the Lemnian women when these murdered all the men in the island. Epopeus was killed by his own mother.

Notes

References 

 Gaius Julius Hyginus, Fabulae from The Myths of Hyginus translated and edited by Mary Grant. University of Kansas Publications in Humanistic Studies. Online version at the Topos Text Project.
 Pseudo-Apollodorus, The Library with an English Translation by Sir James George Frazer, F.B.A., F.R.S. in 2 Volumes, Cambridge, MA, Harvard University Press; London, William Heinemann Ltd. 1921. Online version at the Perseus Digital Library. Greek text available from the same website.
 Publius Ovidius Naso, Metamorphoses translated by Brookes More (1859-1942). Boston, Cornhill Publishing Co. 1922. Online version at the Perseus Digital Library.
 Publius Ovidius Naso, Metamorphoses. Hugo Magnus. Gotha (Germany). Friedr. Andr. Perthes. 1892. Latin text available at the Perseus Digital Library.
 Publius Papinius Statius, The Thebaid translated by John Henry Mozley. Loeb Classical Library Volumes. Cambridge, MA, Harvard University Press; London, William Heinemann Ltd. 1928. Online version at the Topos Text Project.
 Publius Papinius Statius, The Thebaid. Vol I-II. John Henry Mozley. London: William Heinemann; New York: G.P. Putnam's Sons. 1928. Latin text available at the Perseus Digital Library.

Characters in Greek mythology
Mythological rapists
Incestual abuse
Incest in Greek mythology
Dionysus in mythology
Metamorphoses into animals in Greek mythology